"Gett Off" is a song written and produced by American musician Prince, released in June 1991 as the lead single from his thirteenth album, Diamonds and Pearls (1991). The album was his first with his backing band the New Power Generation. "Gett Off" was a hit on both sides of the Atlantic, reaching number four in the United Kingdom. In the United States, the single went to number 21 on the Billboard Hot 100 and number six on the Billboard Hot R&B/Hip-Hop Songs chart. In addition, it was Prince's seventh and final song to reach number one on the Billboard Hot Dance Club Songs chart. It ranked at number 97 in VH1's "100 Greatest Songs of the '90s".

Background and release
"Gett Off" evolved from several earlier compositions, starting with the song "Glam Slam" from 1988's Lovesexy. Prince created an unreleased remix in early 1991 called "Glam Slam '91", which used the chorus of "Glam Slam", but with new music and lyrics that borrowed partially from Graffiti Bridges "Love Machine". Prince toyed with the song some more, adding a new chorus, and involving the newly formed New Power Generation. The song was renamed "Gett Off", which was very similar to a B-side/remix called "Get Off" from the maxi single release of "New Power Generation", also from Graffiti Bridge. "Gett Off" also uses a few musical segments from "Get Off". The new track features vocal contributions from Rosie Gaines and Tony M., and flute by long-time Prince associate Eric Leeds. Prince also contributes a guitar solo. Prince delivered the song exclusively to nightclubs on his 33rd birthday, on a now very valuable 12" single featuring the otherwise unavailable "Gett Off (Damn Near 10 Minutes Mix)" remix. It was so well-received that Prince decided to release the song commercially as a single with the rap song "Horny Pony" as its B-side, and also as a maxi single with several remixes, which varied from country to country. He also added it at the last minute to Diamonds and Pearls, replacing "Horny Pony" (on the packaging for Diamonds and Pearls, "Horny Pony" is written in red over "Gett Off", to fit in with the narrative track listing that was already finished.).Coincidentally Gett Off contains a sample from 'Horny Pony'. As well as being conceived from other compositions, it served as the musical blueprint for "Blue Light" and "Get Wild".

Critical reception
In an retrospective review, Patrick Corcoran of Albumism noted that the song's "exhortation to "23 positions in a one night stand" was a lightning conduit for rampant male sexuality, unfettered by the playful androgyny of the past." Stephen Thomas Erlewine from AllMusic described it as a "slamming dancefloor rallying cry" and a "terrific" pop single. Mike Diver for the BBC felt in his 2010 review, that it's "more explicit" and "borrows a line or two from James Brown but is undeniably Prince through and through". Larry Flick from Billboard wrote that "this delicious sleaze-speed funk dish cuts deep with an intense bass line, vocal shrieks, and racy lyrics." Simon Price from The Guardian named it a "highlight" from the Diamonds and Pearls album, describing it as "hilariously immature". Another editor, Alexis Petridis stated, "From its opening scream to its ferocious concluding guitar solo, Gett Off is prime-quality Prince: funny, lubricious, preposterously funky, every bit the equal of his best work."

Machgiel Bakker from Music & Media called it a "hectic funk workout". A reviewer from Music Week said the song is "a brilliant curtain raiser for his new album. Cool and funky, it evokes memories of George Clinton and Gil Scott-Heron, while remaining totally original. Massive." People Magazine wrote that the singer will "blind you with his brilliance, as he does on the conspicuously funky "Gett Off"." Jeff Weiss from Pitchfork said the song "led to more unplanned pregnancies than anything Prince had recorded" since "Kiss". David Fricke from Rolling Stone commented, "Dirty Mind goes house". Neil McKay from Sunday Life noted that it features "heavy dance".

Music video
An official music video was developed and released for the song. It is directed by Randee St. Nicholas and is notable for the appearance of Diamond & Pearl, as well as Prince's Yellow Cloud Guitar.

"Mother Popcorn"
The lyrics "I like 'em fat, I like 'em proud, you've got to have a mother for me..." and the music that accompanies them in the fourth verse of "Gett Off" are paraphrased from the 1969 James Brown song "Mother Popcorn". Prince alludes to the borrowing in a vocal aside ("Reminds me of something James used to say..."). The musical quotation is preceded by a crackling noise mimicking the sound of an old vinyl record and a sample of Brown's song.

Track listings

7-inch releases
 US 7-19225 "Gett Off" (single remix) – 4:31
 "Horny Pony" – 4:17

 UK W0056 German 5439-19225-7 "Gett Off" (single remix) – 4:01
 "Horny Pony" – 4:17

12-inch releases
 US 0-40138 Australian MX79029-30 UK 0-40138 "Gett Off" (extended remix) – 8:31
 "Gett Off" (Houstyle) – 8:20
 "Violet the Organ Grinder" – 4:59
 "Gett Off" (Flutestramental) – 7:26
 "Gangster Glam" – 6:04
 "Clockin' the Jizz" (Instrumental) – 4:51

 UK W0056T German 9362-40187-0 "Gett Off" (Urge Mix) – 8:20
 "Gett Off" (Thrust Mix) – 9:29

CD maxi single releases
 US 9 40138-2 "Gett Off" (single remix) – 4:31
 "Gett Off" (Houstyle) – 8:20
 "Violet the Organ Grinder" – 4:59
 "Gett Off" (Flutestramental) – 7:26
 "Gangster Glam" – 6:04
 "Clockin' the Jizz" (Instrumental) – 4:51
 "Gett Off" (Extended Remix) – 8:31

 UK W0056CD German 9362-40188-2 "Gett Off" (single remix) – 4:01
 "Gett Off" (Urge Single Edit) – 4:24
 "Gett Off" (Purple Pump Mix) – 8:31

 Japanese WPCP-4630'''
 "Gett Off" (extended remix) – 8:31
 "Gett Off" (Houstyle) – 8:20
 "Violet the Organ Grinder" – 4:59
 "Gangster Glam" – 6:04
 "Cream" (N.P.G Mix) – 4:54
 "Things Have Gotta Change" (Tony M. Rap) – 3:57
 "2 the Wire" (Creamy Instrumental) – 3:13
 "Get Some Solo" – 1:31
 "Do Your Dance" (KC's Remix) – 5:58
 "Housebangers" – 4:23
 "Q in Doubt" (instrumental) – 4:00
 "Ethereal Mix" – 4:43

Notes
"Album Version", "Single Remix", "Extended Remix" a.k.a. "Purple Pump Mix" and "Damn Near 10 Minutes" are edits of the original version.
"Urge Mix" (alternatively titled "Houstyle"), "Thrust Dub" (alternatively titled "Flutestramental"), "Thrust Single Edit", "Urge Single Edit", and "Thrust Mix" are house versions remixed by Steve "Silk" Hurley. 
"Violet the Organ Grinder", "Gangster Glam" and "Clockin' the Jizz" are variations around the original version with added rap parts, chants or instrumental parts.

Charts

Weekly charts

Year-end charts

Release history

Appearances in other media
 The edited 4:04 single mix backmasks the word "ass"; this version was included on the UK compilation Now That's What I Call Music! 20 which marks the first appearance of Prince on a Now Album.
 The maxi-single was too long and pricey for the UK Singles chart, and so this Gett Off release was classed as an album, peaking at number 33 on the UK Albums chart in August 1991.
 On the soundtrack of the 1992 film Innocent Blood.
 A brief snippet of this song as well as Cream, Sexy MF and Darling Nikki were sung by a character in the popular British sketch show The Fast Show. Due to copyright, these clips were not included in the home media releases of the show, despite the anachronistic 1940 music hall setting.
 The song appears in the 2021 film Coming 2 America'', sung by Teyana Taylor, Jermaine Fowler, and Brandon Rogers.

References

1991 singles
1991 songs
Music videos directed by Randee St. Nicholas
New jack swing songs
Paisley Park Records singles
Prince (musician) songs
Song recordings produced by Prince (musician)
Songs about casual sex
Songs written by Prince (musician)
Warner Records singles